Yangshou is a town in Hanjiang District, Yangzhou, Jiangsu, China. , it administers one residential neighborhood (Yangshou) and the following seven villages:
Dongxing Village
Dunliu Village
Fangji Village
Xinlong Village
Baonü Village
Aiguo Village
Yonghe Village

References

Township-level divisions of Jiangsu
Hanjiang District, Yangzhou